The Boötes Dwarf Galaxy (Boo I dSph) is a galaxy discovered in 2006, which appears faint, with a luminosity of  and an absolute magnitude of –5.8. This dwarf spheroidal galaxy appears to be tidally disrupted by the Milky Way Galaxy, which it orbits, and has two stellar tails that cross over to form a cross. Tidally disrupted galaxies usually only form one tail.

Like many of the ultrafaint dwarf spheroidals, the entire galaxy appears fainter than the Rigel system (absolute magnitude –7.84). Even so, it is one of the more luminous UFDs. It is metal-poor, like other UFDs, with a mean metallicity of −2.34.

The stellar population of Boötes I is mostly very old stars. The two populations have essentially the same age, 13.4 billion and 13.3 billion years, respectively, with most of the stars being of the latter population.

Notes 

Apparent magnitude = Absolute magnitude + Distance modulus = –5.8 + 18.9 = 13.1

References

External links
 The Universe within 500,000 light-years The Satellite Galaxies (Atlas of the Universe)
 Two New Galaxies Orbiting the Milky Way (Ken Croswell) April 19, 2006
 Strange satellite galaxies revealed around Milky Way Kimm Groshong (New Scientist) 17:00 24 April 2006
 New Milky Way companions found: SDSS-II first to view two dim dwarf galaxies (SDSS) May 8, 2006
 Astronomers Find Two New Milky Way Companions (SpaceDaily) May 10, 2006
 Boötes Dwarf Galaxy at Constellation Guide

Dwarf spheroidal galaxies
Local Group
Milky Way Subgroup
Boötes
4713553